Sebastian Martin was an Indian Christian faith healer in Vasai, Mumbai, Maharashtra. He was the founder of Ashirward Prayer Centre.

Early career 
He was a chartered accountant and also a lecturer in St. Gonsalo Garcia College, Vasai. On 26 January 1985, in one prayer meeting he accepted Jesus as his Lord and personal Saviour. From then, he gave his life to Jesus. In June 1998 he started Ashirwad Prayer Centre in Bhuigaon, Vasai.

Controversy
In February 2016, Maharashtra Andhashraddha Nirmulan Samiti filed a complaint against Martin. Narendra Dabholkar also filed a police complaint against Martin and his associates for allegedly practicing black magic and the prayer centre was closed down but allowed to reopen after 3 months.

Death 
Martin died on 18 August 2016, in his residence, the cause of which was reported as kidney failure.

References

Faith healers
Magic (supernatural)
Year of birth missing
2016 deaths